Cornelis "Cees" Bolding (7 January 1897 – 1 November 1979) was a Dutch painter. He attended  (National School for Applied Arts Amsterdam) and the Rijksakademie van beeldende kunsten. His work was part of the painting event in the art competition at the 1928 Summer Olympics. Bolding's work was included in the 1939 exhibition and sale Onze Kunst van Heden (Our Art of Today) at the Rijksmuseum in Amsterdam.

References

1897 births
1979 deaths
20th-century Dutch painters
Dutch male painters
Olympic competitors in art competitions
People from Zaanstad
20th-century Dutch male artists